Baba Mohammad Yahya Khan (Urdu بابا محمد یحیی خان) is a Sufi,writer,Traveller,artist. He is a spiritual mentor of many people around the globe. Baba ji introduces himself as a 
Durvaish  of Malaamti Order of Spiritualism. Baba ji has worked in his life in many international cinemas and stage shows etc. He has performed various roles as Baba Bulleh Shah, Miyan Mohammad Bakhsh and many more on plays broadcast on PTV. Baba ji has spread his Sufi thoughts through various books like Piya Rung Kala, Kajal Kotha, Shab Deeda, Lay Baba Ababeel, etc. His works have been translated in different languages as well. Baba ji was born on 7 September 1936 in Sialkot British India.

influenced by
He is closely related to Maulana Abdu Salam Niazi Dehlvi, Allama Iqbal, Mahir ul Qadri, Wasif Ali Wasif, Ashfaq Ahmad, Bano Qudsia and Mumtaz Mufti, Karam Elahi aka Kanwan Wali Sarkar and famous Mir Bashir Palmist .

Literary works 
He is best known for his books. He is author of many books.
  – 2016
  Have seen Night – 2011
 Soot Chamber – 2009
 – 2001
 wax Sculpture
 

See also
Nimra Ahmed Khan

References

1936 births
Living people
Pakistani autobiographers
Urdu-language fiction writers
Pakistani scholars
Pakistani Sufis
People from Sialkot